Archips vagrans is a species of moth of the family Tortricidae. It is found in East Timor.

References

Moths described in 1990
Archips
Moths of Asia